Josephine Edna O'Brien  (born 15 December 1930) is an Irish novelist, memoirist, playwright, poet and short-story writer. Elected to Aosdána by her fellow artists, she was honoured with the title Saoi in 2015 and the  "UK and Ireland Nobel" David Cohen Prize in 2019, whilst France made her Commandeur de l'Ordre des Arts et des Lettres in 2021.

O'Brien's works often revolve around the inner feelings of women, and their problems in relating to men, and to society as a whole. Her first novel, The Country Girls (1960), is often credited with breaking silence on sexual matters and social issues during a repressive period in Ireland following the Second World War. The book was banned, burned and denounced from the pulpit. Faber and Faber published her memoir, Country Girl, in 2012. O'Brien lives in London.

O'Brien has been mentioned as a candidate for the Nobel Prize in literature. Philip Roth described her as "the most gifted woman now writing in English", while a former President of Ireland, Mary Robinson, cited her as "one of the great creative writers of her generation". Others to hail her as one of the greatest writers alive include John Banville, Michael Ondaatje and Sir Ian McKellen. O'Brien received the Irish PEN Award in 2001. Saints and Sinners won the 2011 Frank O'Connor International Short Story Award, the world's richest prize for a short-story collection.

Life and career
Josephine Edna O'Brien was born in 1930 to farmer Michael O'Brien and Lena Cleary at Tuamgraney, County Clare, Ireland, a place she would later describe as "fervid" and "enclosed". The family lived at "Drewsborough" (also "Drewsboro"), a "large two-storey house", which her mother kept in "semi-grandeur". Michael O'Brien, "whose family had seen wealthier times" as landowners, had inherited a "thousand acres or more" and "a fortune from rich uncles", but was a "profligate" hard-drinker who gambled away his inheritance, the land "sold off in bits ... or bartered to pay debts"; Lena "came from a poorer background". According to O'Brien, her mother was a strong, controlling woman who had emigrated temporarily to America, and worked for some time as a maid in Brooklyn, New York, for a well-off Irish-American family before returning to Ireland to raise her family. O'Brien was the youngest child of "a strict, religious family". From 1941 to 1946 she was educated by the Sisters of Mercy at the Convent of Mercy boarding school at Loughrea, County Galway – a circumstance that contributed to a "suffocating" childhood. "I rebelled against the coercive and stifling religion into which I was born and bred. It was very frightening and all pervasive. I'm glad it has gone." She was fond of a nun as she deeply missed her mother and tried to identify the nun with her. In 1950, having studied at night at pharmaceutical college and worked in a Dublin pharmacy during the day, O'Brien was awarded a licence as a pharmacist. In Ireland, she read such writers as Tolstoy, Thackeray, and F. Scott Fitzgerald.

In Dublin, O'Brien bought Introducing James Joyce, with an introduction written by T. S. Eliot, and said that when she learned that James Joyce's A Portrait of the Artist as a Young Man was autobiographical, it made her realise where she might turn, should she want to write herself. "Unhappy houses are a very good incubation for stories", she said. In London she started work as a reader for Hutchinson, where on the basis of her reports she was commissioned, for £50, to write a novel. She published her first book, The Country Girls, in 1960. This was the first part of a trilogy of novels (later collected as The Country Girls Trilogy), which included The Lonely Girl (1962) and Girls in Their Married Bliss (1964). Shortly after their publication, these books were banned and, in some cases burned, in her native country due to their frank portrayals of the sex lives of their characters. O'Brien herself was accused of "corrupting the minds of young women"; she later said: "I felt no fame. I was married. I had young children. All I could hear out of Ireland from my mother and anonymous letters was bile and odium and outrage."

In the 1960s, she was a patient of R.D. Laing: "I thought he might be able to help me. He couldn't do that – he was too mad himself – but he opened doors", she later said. Her novel, A Pagan Place (1970), was about her repressive childhood. Her parents were vehemently against all things related to literature; her mother strongly disapproved of her daughter's career as a writer. Once when her mother found a Seán O'Casey book in her daughter's possession, she tried to burn it.

Alongside Teddy Taylor (Conservative), Michael Foot (Labour) and Derek Worlock (Catholic Archbishop of Liverpool), O'Brien was a panel member for the first edition of the BBC's Question Time in 1979 and was awarded the first answer in the programme's history ("Edna O'Brien, you were born there", referring to Ireland). Taylor's death in 2017 left her as the sole surviving member. In 1980, she wrote a play, Virginia, about Virginia Woolf, and it was staged originally in June 1980 at the Stratford Festival, Ontario, Canada and subsequently in the West End of London at the Theatre Royal Haymarket with Maggie Smith and directed by Robin Phillips. It was staged at The Public Theater in New York in 1985. Also in 1980 O'Brien appeared alongside Patrick McGoohan in TV movie The Hard Way. Other works include a biography of James Joyce, published in 1999, and one of the poet Lord Byron, Byron in Love (2009). House of Splendid Isolation (1994), her novel about a terrorist who goes on the run (part of her research involved visiting Irish republican Dominic McGlinchey, later shot dead, whom she called "a grave and reflective man"), marked a new phase in her writing career. Down by the River (1996) concerned an under-age rape victim who sought an abortion in England, the "Miss X case". In the Forest (2002) dealt with the real-life case of Brendan O'Donnell, who abducted and murdered a woman, her three-year-old son, and a priest, in rural Ireland.

In September 2021, it was announced that O'Brien would be donating her archive to the National Library of Ireland. The Library will hold papers from O'Brien covering the period of 2000 to 2021 and includes correspondence, drafts, notes, and revisions. O'Brien's papers from 1939 to 2000 are held by Emory University in Atlanta, Georgia.

Awards and honours
O'Brien's awards include the Yorkshire Post Book Award in 1970 (for A Pagan Place), and the Los Angeles Times Book Prize in 1990 for Lantern Slides. In 2006, she was appointed adjunct professor of English Literature in University College, Dublin.

In 2009, O'Brien was honoured with the Bob Hughes Lifetime Achievement Award during a special ceremony at the year's Irish Book Awards in Dublin. Her collection Saints and Sinners won the 2011 Frank O'Connor International Short Story Award, with judge Thomas McCarthy referring to her as "the Solzhenitsyn of Irish life". RTÉ aired a documentary on her as part of its Arts strand in early 2012. On 10 April 2018, for her contributions to literature, she was appointed an honorary Dame of the Order of the British Empire.

In 2019, O'Brien was awarded the David Cohen Prize for Literature at a ceremony in London. The £40,000 prize, awarded every two years in recognition of a living writer's lifetime achievement in literature, has been described as the "UK and Ireland Nobel in literature". Judge David Park said "In winning the David Cohen Prize, Edna O’Brien adds her name to a literary roll call of honour".

In March 2021, France announced that it would be awarding O'Brien Ordre des Arts et des Lettres, France's highest honour for the arts.

Legacy
According to Scottish novelist Andrew O'Hagan, O'Brien's place in Irish letters is assured. "She changed the nature of Irish fiction; she brought the woman's experience and sex and internal lives of those people on to the page, and she did it with style, and she made those concerns international." Irish novelist Colum McCann avers that O'Brien has been "the advance scout for the Irish imagination" for over fifty years.

Emory University (Atlanta, Georgia) holds her papers up to 2000. More recent papers are at University College Dublin

Personal life
In 1954, O'Brien met and married, against her parents' wishes, the Irish writer Ernest Gébler, and the couple moved to London, where, as she later put it, "We lived in SW 20. Sub-urb-ia." They had two sons, Carlo, a writer, and Sasha, an architect, but the marriage ended in 1964. In 2009, Carlo revealed that his parents' marriage had been volatile, with bitter rows between his mother and father over her success. Initially believing he deserved credit for helping her become an accomplished writer, Gébler came to believe he was the author of O'Brien's books. He died in 1998.

Other honours and awards
 1962: Kingsley Amis Award
 1970: The Yorkshire Post Book Award (Book of the Year), for A Pagan Place
 1990: Los Angeles Times Book Prize for Fiction, for Lantern Slides
 1991: Premio Grinzane Cavour (Italy), for Girl with Green Eyes
 1993: Writers' Guild Award (Best Fiction), for Time and Tide
 1995: European Prize for Literature (European Association for the Arts), for House of Splendid Isolation
 2000: Golden Plate Award of the American Academy of Achievement
 2001: Irish PEN Award
 2006: Ulysses Medal (University College Dublin)
 2009: Bob Hughes Lifetime Achievement Award
 2010: Shortlisted for Irish Book of the Decade (Irish Book Awards), for In the Forest
 2012: Irish Book Awards (Irish Non-Fiction Book), for Country Girl
 2015: Saoi
 2018: PEN/Nabokov Award
 2019: David Cohen Prize
 2021: Commandeur de l'Ordre des Arts et des Lettres (France)

List of works

Novels
 1960: The Country Girls
 1962: The Lonely Girl later published as Girl with Green Eyes
 1964: Girls in Their Married Bliss
 1965: August Is a Wicked Month
 1966: Casualties of Peace
 1970: A Pagan Place
 1972: Night
 1977: Johnny I Hardly Knew You; in US, "I Hardly Knew You"
 1987: The Country Girls Trilogy with new epilogue
 1988: The High Road
 1992: Time and Tide
 1994: House of Splendid Isolation
 1996: Down by the River
 1999: Wild Decembers
 2002: In the Forest
 2006: The Light of Evening
 2015: The Little Red Chairs
 2019: Girl

Short story collections
 1968: The Love Object and Other Stories
 1974: A Scandalous Woman and Other Stories
 1978: Mrs Reinhardt and Other Stories
 1982: Returning
 1985: A Fanatic Heart
 1990: Lantern Slides
 2011: Saints and Sinners
 2013: The Love Object: Selected Stories, a fifty-year retrospective,

Drama
 1973  "A Pagan Place"
 1975: Zee and Co
 1980: Virginia
 2005: Family Butchers
 2005: Triptych and Iphigenia
 2009: Haunted
 2011; "The Country Girls"
 2014 "Joyce's Women"

Screenplays
 1971: "Zee & Co."

Nonfiction books
 1976: Mother Ireland,
 1977: Arabian Days
 1979: Some Irish Loving, as editor: anthology
 1981  "James & Nora"; reprinted in 2020
 1986: Vanishing Ireland (with photographs by Richard Fitzgerald),
 1999: James Joyce, biography
 2009: Byron in Love, biography
 2012: Country Girl, memoir

Children's books
 1981: The Dazzle
 1982: A Christmas Treat
 1983: "The Rescue"
 2017: Tales for the Telling,

Poetry collections
 1989: On the Bone

See also

References

Further reading
 
 

Schrank, Bernice (1999). Edna O'Brien. 

 Trevor, William (1976). "Edna O'Brien", in Contemporary Novelists.

External links

 
 O'Brien at Clare County Library
 
 "Audio Interview with Edna O'Brien" at WiredForBooks, 22 May 1992
 "Lit Chat" at salon.com, 2 December 1995
 "You have to be lonely to be a writer" – O'Brien video interview for The Guardian, 7 December 2012
 Video recording of O'Brien reads an extract from her autobiography Country Girl
 Stuart A. Rose Manuscript, Archives, and Rare Book Library, Emory University: O'Brien papers, circa 1939-2000

1930 births
Living people
Aosdána members
David Cohen Prize recipients
Fellows of the Royal Society of Literature
Honorary Dames Commander of the Order of the British Empire
Irish biographers
Irish memoirists
Irish women memoirists
Irish PEN Award for Literature winners
Irish women short story writers
Irish women dramatists and playwrights
Irish women novelists
Irish women poets
People from County Clare
Saoithe
20th-century Irish dramatists and playwrights
20th-century Irish novelists
20th-century Irish short story writers
20th-century Irish women writers
21st-century Irish dramatists and playwrights
21st-century Irish novelists
21st-century Irish short story writers
21st-century Irish women writers
Women biographers
PEN/Nabokov Award winners